The 2019–20 UMass Lowell River Hawks men's basketball team represented the University of Massachusetts Lowell in the 2019–20 NCAA Division I men's basketball season. They split their home games between the Costello Athletic Center and the Tsongas Center, both of which are located in Lowell, Massachusetts, and were led by seventh-year head coach Pat Duquette. They finished the season 13–19, 7–9 in America East play to finish in a tie for sixth place. They lost in the quarterfinals of the America East tournament to Hartford.

Previous season
The River Hawks finished the 2018–19 season 15–17, 7–9 in conference play to finish in a tie for fifth place. In the America East tournament, they were defeated by Hartford in the quarterfinals.

Roster

Schedule and results

|-
!colspan=12 style=| Non-conference regular season

|-
!colspan=9 style=| America East Conference regular season

|-
!colspan=12 style=| America East tournament
|-

|-

Source

References

UMass Lowell River Hawks men's basketball seasons
UMass Lowell River Hawks
UMass Lowell River Hawks men's basketball
UMass Lowell River Hawks men's basketball